Singing Bird is the fifth solo studio album by Japanese singer Koshi Inaba, of B'z fame. It was released by Vermillion Records on May 21, 2014 in Japan. The album debuted at #1 at the Japanese Oricon weekly album charts and at #2 at the Billboard Japan Top Albums chart, besides reaching 39# at Oricon's 2014 year-end chart. The song "Oh My Love" received a video and was used at a commercial of a new camera by Olympus. The video featured Japanese football player Keisuke Honda.

Track listing

Personnel 
 Koshi Inaba - vocals on all tracks, guitar on "Jimmy no Asa" and "Cross Creek", acoustic guitar on "Tomoyo", djembe on "Jimmy no Asa", blues harp on "Route 53" and "Nensho", electric sitar

Session members 
 Yoshinobu Ōga - guitar on tracks 2, 4, 6, 10, 12
 Rafael Moreira - guitar on "Cross Creek", "Bicycle Girl" and "Kodoku no Susume"
 Yogi Ronitchi - electric and acoustic guitar on "Tomoyo", guitar on "Route 53"
 Akihito Tokunaga - arrangement on "Stay Free" and "Kodoku no Susume", bass on tracks 3, 4, 6, 8, 10, 12
 Taneda Takeshi - bass on "Oh My Love" and "Route 56"
 Corey McCormick - bass on "Bicycle Girl"
 Koichi Osame - bass on "Tomoyo"
 Shane Gaalaas - drums on all tracks except 1, 2, 4, 9, 11
 Hideo Yamaki - drums on "Tomoyo" and "Route 53"
 Satoko - drums on "Oh My Love"
 Akira Onozuka - organ on "Oh My Love" and "Route 53", piano on "Nakinagara" and "Nensho", organ on "Stay Free"
 Yamamoto Takuo - flute on "Jimmy no Asa", "Golden Road" and "Nakinagara"
 Yumiko Morooka - cello on "Jimmy no Asa"
 Hiroko Ishikawa and Lime Ladies Orchestra - strings on "Nakinagara", "Tomoyo" and "Route 53"
 Hideyuki Terachi - arrangement on all tracks except "Stay Free" and "Kodoku no Susume"

References

External links
Singing Bird at B'z official website

2014 albums
Being Inc. albums
Koshi Inaba albums